Dachigam National Park is a national park located,  from Srinagar city in Srinagar district of Jammu and Kashmir, India on the east side of Dal Lake. It covers an area of 161|62.16(updated recently) by hgtian student SIJ. The name of the park literally stands for "ten villages" which is in the memory of the ten villages that were relocated for its formation. These ten villages were living in this region before the World War I in the beginning of 20th century. The main gate entrance is very close to the New Theed general bus stand on the either side of Darul Uloom Kousaria.

The park has been a protected area since 1910, first under the care of the Maharaja of Jammu and Kashmir and later under the observation of the concerned government authorities. It was initially created to ensure a supply of clean drinking water for Srinagar. It was upgraded and declared a National Park in 1981.

Topography 
Dachigam National park is located in the Zabarwan Range of the western Himalayas. The variation in altitude is vast, ranging from 5500 ft to 14000 ft above mean sea level. Due to this vast variation, the park is demarcated into an uneven region. The terrain ranges from gently sloping grasslands to sharp rocky outcrops and cliffs.
321

Flora 
The mountain sides below the tree line are wooded. Most of this coniferous forest consists of broad leaf species. Interspersed between these are alpine pastures, meadows, waterfalls and scrub vegetation with deep gullies, locally known as Nars, running down the mountain face. Most of the grasslands and meadows, except in the harsh winters, are covered with coloured flowers. Located high among its interiors is the Marsar lake from which flows the Dagwan river. This river flows all the way down to, and past, the lower region where it runs along the only proper road in the park and is also known for its fish population, the trout.

Fauna 
The main animal species that Dachigam is known for is the hangul, or the Kashmir stag. Other species include:

Musk deer (roose kat) 
Snow Leopard
Himalayan serow
Kashmir grey langur
Kashmir stag (hangul)
Leopard cat (nt)
Himalayan black bear (vu)
Himalayan brown bear
Jackal
Hill fox
Himalayan weasel
Yellow-throated marten
Jungle cat
Long-tailed marmot
Otter

Birds 
Cinnamon sparrow
Black bulbul
Himalayan monal
Golden oriole
Minivet
Pygmy owlet
Woodpecker
Babbler
Redstart
Wagtail
Koklass pheasant
Chough
Orange bullfinch
Kashmir flycatcher
Tytler's leaf warbler
Streaked laughingthrush
Himalayan rubythroat
Wallcreeper
Black-and-yellow grosbeak
Himalayan griffon vulture
Bearded vulture
Red-billed blue magpie
Titmouse

See also
 Overa-Aru Wildlife Sanctuary
 Hirpora Wildlife Sanctuary
 Gulmarg Wildlife Sanctuary

References

External links 

National parks in Jammu and Kashmir
Protected areas established in 1910
Tourist attractions in Srinagar district
1910 establishments in India
1981 establishments in Jammu and Kashmir